Cancelo is a settlement in the eastern part of the island of Santiago, Cape Verde. It is part of the municipality Santa Cruz. It is situated near the east coast, 4 km northwest of Pedra Badejo and 5 km southeast of Calheta de São Miguel. In 2010 its population was 2,042.

References

Villages and settlements in Santiago, Cape Verde
Populated coastal places in Cape Verde
Santa Cruz, Cape Verde